= Trade papers =

Trade papers may refer to:

- A trade paperback, low-quality binding for a printed book
- Multiple trade papers, specialist magazines for the members of a trade
